Trithecanthera is a genus of showy mistletoes in the family Loranthaceae. It contains approximately 5 species in the Malesian region of South East Asia. The genus includes the species described within the genus Kingella as Kingella scortechinii.

References

 Tieghem (1894) Bull. Soc. Bot. France 41: 597.
 Danser (1933) Verh. Kon. Akad. Wetensch., Afd. Natuurk., sect. 2, 29: 128.

Loranthaceae
Loranthaceae genera